Bowdre Township is one of nine townships in Douglas County, Illinois, USA.  As of the 2010 census, its population was 668 and it contained 323 housing units.  Its name was changed from Deer Creek to Bowdre on June 5, 1868.

Geography

Cities, towns, villages
 Hindsboro

Unincorporated towns
 Hugo at 
 Kemp at

Cemeteries
The township contains these three cemeteries: Antioch, Gill and Van Voorhis.

Major highways
  Illinois Route 130
  Illinois Route 133

Demographics

School districts
 Arcola Consolidated Unit School District 306
 Oakland Community Unit School District 5
 Tuscola Community Unit School District 301
 Villa Grove Community Unit School District 302

Political districts
 State House District 110
 State Senate District 55

References
 
 United States Census Bureau 2009 TIGER/Line Shapefiles
 United States National Atlas

External links
 City-Data.com
 Illinois State Archives
 Township Officials of Illinois

Townships in Douglas County, Illinois
Townships in Illinois